The Angeac-Charente bonebed is a fossil deposit located near Angeac-Charente in western France. It dates to the Berriasian stage of the Early Cretaceous, and is coeval with the Purbeck Group of Southern England. It has amongst the most diverse assemblages of earliest Cretaceous vertebrates known from Europe.

History of discovery 
Dinosaur bones were first found at the site in 2008. The fossils were exposed during quarrying for overlying Pleistocene aged sand and gravel. After more bones were discovered in 2010, a team was set up composed of people from Musée d’Angoulême, Rennes University and the Muséum national d’Histoire naturelle to excavate the site. Due the promising finds, since 2011 excavations have been conducted at the site annually.

Geology and Paleoenvironment 
The site was previously considered Hauterivian-Barremian in age, but is now considered likely middle-late Berriasian in age. The paleoenvironment is considered to have been a freshwater floodplain, dominanted by cheirolepidacean conifers, with a tropical or subtropical climate. The lithology of the site is predominantly clay.

Paleobiota

Fish

Amphibians

Turtles

Lepidosauria

Choristodera

Pterosaurs

Crocodyliforms

Dinosaurs

Ornithischians

Sauropods

Theropods

Mammals

References 

Berriasian Stage
Lower Cretaceous Series of Europe